This is a list of members of the 26th Legislative Assembly of Queensland from 1932 to 1935, as elected at the 1932 state election held on 11 June 1932.

  On 19 February 1933, the CPNP member for Wynnum, Walter Barnes, died. CPNP candidate James Bayley won the resulting by-election on 29 April 1933.
  On 19 May 1933, the Labor member for Fortitude Valley, Thomas Wilson, died. Labor candidate Samuel Brassington won the resulting by-election on 15 July 1933.
  On 22 October 1933, the CPNP member for Stanley, Ernest Grimstone, died. CPNP candidate Roy Bell won the resulting by-election on 9 December 1933.
  On 2 June 1934, the CPNP member for East Toowoomba, Robert Roberts, died. CPNP candidate James Annand won the resulting by-election on 18 August 1934.

See also
1932 Queensland state election
Forgan Smith Ministry (Labor) (1932–1942)

References

 Waterson, D.B. Biographical register of the Queensland Parliament, 1930-1980 Canberra: ANU Press (1982)
 

Members of Queensland parliaments by term
20th-century Australian politicians